Jocimar Nascimento (born 18 January 1979), also known as Lambiru, is a Brazilian football player. He is most known for his tenure at Motagua in the Honduran Liga Nacional as a forward, coming by a recommendation of Luciano Emílio. He tried out for a season in the Chinese Super League but came back to Motagua. He knows the Honduran National Anthem and stated that if he would be called up for the Honduran team that he would be glad to accept.

With his help, Motagua has won the last edition of UNCAF Interclubes in 2007 and the 2006–07 Apertura season.

In May 2010, he signed for C.D. Suchitepéquez in  the Guatemalan league.

Jocimar previously played for Figueirense Futebol Clube in the Campeonato Brasileiro.

In January 2014, Jocimar signed a one-year contract with Tajik League side FC Istiklol. After leaving Istikol, he signed to play for his hometown team, Esporte Clube Tupy.

Honours
 Motagua
 2006–07 Apertura
 2007 Interclubes UNCAF

References

1979 births
Living people
Brazilian footballers
Oeste Futebol Clube players
Guaratinguetá Futebol players
Figueirense FC players
Esporte Clube São Bento players
União São João Esporte Clube players
Ionikos F.C. players
F.C. Motagua players
C.D. Olimpia players
C.D. Suchitepéquez players
C.D.S. Vida players
Deportes Savio players
Liga Nacional de Fútbol Profesional de Honduras players
Expatriate footballers in Greece
Expatriate footballers in Guatemala
Expatriate footballers in Honduras
Association football forwards